Athos is a 1994 album by Stephan Micus that was released on ECM.

Based on a three-day visit to Mount Athos, Micus tries to capture his experiences with the Greek Orthodox liturgy he experienced in the monasteries there, framing it with pieces that evoke his emotions at going to and leaving the isolated peninsula. Between them he recreates the liturgical experience of the services during his stay, in six alternating pieces of night and day.

As in his other works, Micus uses a combination of traditional instruments from various cultures to capture the feel of the monastery. These include: the sattar (a bowed 10-string instrument used by the Uyghur), the shakuhachi (a Japanese bamboo flute), the suling (a reed flute from Bali), the ney (a Middle Eastern flute), and 22 flowerpots, filled with water, which he plays with his hands and with mallets. These instruments are only used in the pieces representing the days on Mount Athos.

To emulate the Greek Orthodox tradition of not using musical instruments in their services, his pieces devoted to the nights are performed by a 22-man choir singing prayers to the Virgin Mary.

Track listing
 "On the Way"
 "The First Night"
 "The First Day"
 "The Second Night"
 "The Second Day"
 "The Third Night"
 "The Third Day"
 "On the Way Back"

References

ECM Records albums
Stephan Micus albums
1994 albums